Mark Hochstrasser is an American biologist, currently the Eugene Higgins Professor of Molecular Biophysics and Biochemistry and Professor of Molecular, Cellular, and Developmental Biology at Yale University. Hochstrasser's research group has made many important contributions to our understanding of eukaryotic cell biology, particularly discoveries on the ubiquitin-proteasome system and the small ubiquitin-like modifier (SUMO) protein.

Hochstrasser is an Elected Fellow of both the American Association for the Advancement of Science and the American Academy of Arts and Sciences and is on the editorial board of the journals Cell, Genes and Development, and EMBO Journal.

References

Fellows of the American Association for the Advancement of Science
Yale University faculty
21st-century American biologists
Rutgers University alumni
Living people
University of California, San Francisco alumni
Year of birth missing (living people)